Bright Water Waldorf School is a Preschool through Grade Eight Waldorf School in Seattle, Washington, located in the Japanese Community Cultural Center of Washington in Seattle's International District; Its grade school program includes Japanese, Spanish, Handwork, Woodworking, Aikido, Orchestra, and Band.

Bright Water Waldorf School was founded in 1998 and is a Candidate Member of the Northwest Association of Independent Schools and a Developing School in the Association of Waldorf Schools of North America (AWSNA).

See also
Waldorf education
Curriculum of the Waldorf schools

References

External links 

Private elementary schools in Washington (state)
Private middle schools in Washington (state)
Schools in Seattle
Waldorf schools in the United States